Hermann Fehringer (born 8 December 1962 in Amstetten) is a former pole vaulter from Austria.

His personal best was 5.77 metres, achieved in July 1991 in Linz. This is the current Austrian record.

International competitions

References

External links

1962 births
Living people
Austrian male pole vaulters
Athletes (track and field) at the 1988 Summer Olympics
Athletes (track and field) at the 1992 Summer Olympics
Olympic athletes of Austria
European Athletics Championships medalists
People from Amstetten, Lower Austria
Sportspeople from Lower Austria